Palloor is a revenue village which forms a part of  Mahé municipality of Puducherry, India. The Pincode is 673310.

References

External Links
 

Villages in Mahe district